Vinson's slit-faced bat (Nycteris vinsoni) is a species of slit-faced bat known only from two specimens. Both specimens were smoked out of a baobab tree in a national park in southern Mozambique. Virtually nothing is known about this species.

N. vinsoni was once considered a synonym of Nycteris macrotis, but it became recognized as a separate species in 2004. Some, however, still consider N. vinsoni to be a subspecies of N. macrotis. Others believe the correct name for the species should be N. aethiopica.

References

Endemic fauna of Mozambique
Bats of Africa
Mammals of Mozambique
Nycteridae
Mammals described in 1965